This is a list of members of the 3rd Legislative Assembly of Queensland from 1867 to 1868, as elected at the 1867 colonial elections held between 18 June 1867 and 19 July 1867 (due to problems of distance and communications, it was not possible to hold the elections on a single day).

See also
Premier:
 Robert Mackenzie (1867–1868)

Notes

 At the 1867 election, Thomas Henry FitzGerald stood as a candidate in two seats: Rockhampton (27 June) and Kennedy (19 July). Having won Rockhampton, he resigned Rockhampton on 30 June as he preferred to win Kennedy. Archibald Archer was returned unopposed in the subsequent by-election in Rockhampton on 27 July.
 On 11 May 1868, Charles Fitzsimmons, the member for Clermont, resigned. John Scott won the resulting by-election on 22 June 1868.
 On 11 May 1868, Edmund Royds, the member for Leichhardt, resigned. Edmund's brother, Charles Royds, won the resulting by-election on 29 June 1868.

References

 Waterson, Duncan Bruce: Biographical Register of the Queensland Parliament 1860–1929 (second edition), Sydney 2001.
 Alphabetical Register of Members (Queensland Parliament)

Members of Queensland parliaments by term
19th-century Australian politicians